Division Day is an alternative rock band based in Los Angeles, California. The band consists of four members: Ryan Wilson (guitar), Rohner Segnitz (keyboards/vocals), Kevin Lenhart (drums) and Seb Bailey (bass/vocals).

They performed at the South by Southwest music festival in 2008.  Since then, the band has recently significantly changed its sound with its most recent album, Visitation.

Discography

Albums 
The Mean Way In (2004)
Beartrap Island (2007, Eenie Meenie Records)
Visitation (2009, Dangerbird Records)

Digital 45s 
Bullet In The Rain (2010, Dangerbird Records)

References

charts

Indie rock musical groups from California
Dangerbird Records artists